Beware of the dog (also rendered as Beware of dog) is a warning sign indicating that a dangerous dog is within. Such signs may be placed to deter burglary even if there is no dog, or if the dog is not actually a competent guard dog.

History
Warning signs of this sort have been found in ancient Roman buildings such as the House of the Tragic Poet in Pompeii, which contains a mosaic with the caption cave canem. These warnings may sometimes have been intended to protect not the reader but the dog, preventing visitors from stepping upon small, delicate and cute dogs of the Italian Greyhound type.

Law

Under English law, placing such a sign does not relieve the owner of responsibility for any harm which may come to people attacked by the dog. Where a company employs the services of a guard dog, Chapter 50 of the Guard Dogs Act 1975 requires "a notice containing a warning that a guard dog is present is clearly exhibited at each entrance to the premises." In many cases, security signs integrate both CCTV warnings and Guard Dog warnings into the same signage.

Biblical reference
Philippians 3:2 is translated as "beware of the dogs" or "beware of dogs" in the King James Bible and many other editions. For example:

This is often interpreted as a euphemism, bad people having been described as dogs in a number of previous biblical passages. Nonetheless, the yard signs are sometimes alluded to in reference to the passage. The use of such signs in the Roman world may have influenced the author of the passage, and conversely the passage may have influenced the wording of the more modern yard signs.

References

External links

Guard Dogs Act 1975
  Beware of Dog Sign Printable

Dog equipment
Signage